City-county may refer to:

Consolidated city-county, in the United States
City counties (Poland), City and powiat (county) in Poland
corporate county, a city with county status, formerly in Great Britain and Ireland

See also
Independent city
Metropolitan county, urban county designation in England since 1974